CISO-FM is a Canadian radio station, which broadcasts a modern rock format at 89.1 MHz in Orillia, Ontario. The station is branded as 89.1 Max FM.

History
Owned by Bayshore Broadcasting, the station received CRTC approval on June 1, 2009.

The station launched in late 2010 as an adult contemporary format branded as Sunshine 89.1.

On November 1, 2018, CISO-FM rebranded to 89.1 Max FM with a classic hits format playing the best of the 70's, 80's and 90's.

On May 17, 2019, the station changed its format to modern rock but retained its "Max FM" branding.

References

External links
89.1 Max FM
 
 

Radio stations in Simcoe County
Orillia
Iso
Radio stations established in 2009
2009 establishments in Ontario